Vladimir Nikolayevich Shcherbak (born 2 September 1959) is a former Russian professional footballer.

Club career
He made his professional debut in the Soviet Second League in 1977 for FC Shakhtar Horlivka.

Honours
 Soviet Top League bronze: 1982.

References

1959 births
People from Torez
Living people
Soviet footballers
Association football defenders
Russian footballers
FC Shakhtar Horlivka players
SKA Kiev players
FC Shakhtar Donetsk players
FC Spartak Moscow players
FC SKA Rostov-on-Don players
FC Rostov players
FC Metalist Kharkiv players
FC APK Morozovsk players
PFC Krylia Sovetov Samara players
Soviet Top League players
Russian Premier League players